César Chávez Academy - Academia César Chávez is a K-12 public charter school in Detroit, Michigan. It is operated by The Leona Group, an operator of charter schools in Arizona, Florida, Michigan, and Ohio.

Enrollment increase and grade school renovations
Not long after César Chávez opened, MPNE was renamed "The Leona Group" in honor of Bill Coates' mother, Leona Coates. This name change reflected MPNE's change in focus from a quasi-public think tank/advocacy group to a privately owned, for-profit corporation.

Upper Elementary
At some point a separate Upper Elementary complex was added on Martin just south of Michigan Avenue.
It uses the former school and parish hall of Our Lady Queen of Angels Church also known as Our Lady of Guadalupe.

Gallery

See also
List of public school academy districts in Michigan

References

External links
 

High schools in Detroit
The Leona Group
Charter schools in Michigan
Public high schools in Michigan
Public middle schools in Michigan
Public elementary schools in Michigan
1996 establishments in Michigan